Le Parcq is a commune in the Pas-de-Calais department in the Hauts-de-France region of France.

Geography
Le Parcq lies about 18 miles (29 km) southeast of Montreuil-sur-Mer, on the N39 road, in the valley of the Ternoise river.

Administration
On 1 January 2007, Le Parcq became part of the arrondissement of Montreuil, with the other communes of the then canton of Le Parcq. Previously, Le Parcq was in the arrondissement of Arras. At the French canton reorganisation which came into effect in March 2015, the canton of Le Parcq was disbanded and its communes became part of the canton of Auxi-le-Château.

Population

History
The establishment of Le Parcq dates from the founding of a castle (on the south border of the village to Vieil-Hesdin) by Baldwin I of Constantinople or Baudouin IX, Count of Flanders in about 1208. It was a wooden enclosure surrounded by walls within which wild animals were placed in large numbers.

In 1329, portcullises were installed at all the gates of the castle. Unfortunately, in 1335, Edward III destroyed the castle just before the start of the Hundred Years War. This destruction was continued in 1337 by Charles III of Navarre who brought down the walls. In 1395, Philip II of Burgundy restored the castle walls.

Several people were employed daily to feed the animals in the park which also had a vast falconry centre and two fishing lakes. The park totalled 940 hectares with a perimeter of approximately 8 miles (13 km), opening onto the outside world by many gates.

After the destruction of Vieil-Hesdin in) 1553 by Charles V, the park was, at the initiative of Philippe V of France, made the parkland available to those displaced by the fall of the old town, who wished to build new homes on the parkland. To attract more people, tax benefits were given, on February 25, 1586 to all those moving into the area.

Thus, the park became a village, originally known as Parc-lès-Hesdin. The municipality was formally recognized in 1670 and on February 8, 1816, Le Parcq also became chef-lieu of the canton by royal decree.

Places of interest
 The Château d'Estruval
 The sixteenth century church of St.Nicholas.
 Notre Dame de Bon Secours chapel dating from 1871
 Notre Dame du Chêne chapel.
 Château of Vieil-Hesdin dating from the eleventh century.

See also
Communes of the Pas-de-Calais department

References

Parcq
Artois